Jon Ikeda (born July 31, 1965) is an American automobile designer and executive. He currently serves as vice president and brand officer of Acura, the luxury and performance division of Honda Motor Company.

Early life and education 
Ikeda, a Japanese American, grew up in Glendale and Pasadena, California. In 1989, he graduated from the Art Center College of Design in Pasadena, with a Bachelor of Science in industrial design.

Career 
In fall 1989, Ikeda was hired by Honda, working at the automaker's advanced design studio in Tokyo. While in Japan, he contributed to the design of the award-winning 1991 Honda FS-X concept, as well as the first generation Acura RL.

in 1995, he was relocated to Honda R&D Americas. Upon returning to the United States, he was named design project leader of the 2001 Honda Civic coupe, and was lead designer of the 2004 Acura TL, the best-selling Acura model of all time. In his role as chief designer and division director, Ikeda was instrumental in the construction of the Acura Design Studio in 2007.

In July 2015, Ikeda was promoted to vice president and general manager of Acura. In his new role, he was credited with reinvigorating the Acura brand with a renewed focus on design.

On April 1, 2019, he was named brand officer of Acura.

References 

1965 births
Living people
Acura
American automobile designers
American people of Japanese descent
American businesspeople
Art Center College of Design alumni
Corporate executives in the automobile industry
Honda people
People from Glendale, California
People from Pasadena, California